This is a list of notable Polish Americans, including both original immigrants who obtained citizenship and their American descendants.

Academics
 Leon M. Goldstein (died 1999), President of Kingsborough Community College, and acting Chancellor of the City University of New York
 Joseph S. Murphy (1933–1998), President of Queens College, President of Bennington College, and Chancellor of the City University of New York
 Joseph Opala (born 1950), scholar of African American history

Arts and entertainment

Actors and personalities – TV, radio and film

 Nick Adams (1931–1968), film actor; mother was of Polish descent
 Bogdan Szumilas (born 1956),  Polish-French-American actor, model, producer, Impresario, talent agent,PR 
 Grant Aleksander (born 1960), film and daytime actor, Guiding Light
 Pico Alexander (born 1991), actor; parents are Polish immigrants
 Stanley Andrews (1891–1969), TV/radio actor
 Anna Anka (born 1971), actress, model, and author
 David Arquette (born 1971), actor, director, screenwriter; mother (née Nowak) was of Polish Jewish and Russian Jewish descent
 Rosanna Arquette (born 1959), actress, director, producer; mother (née Nowak) was of Polish Jewish and Russian Jewish descent
 Jacob Artist (born 1992), actor, singer, and dancer; mother is of Polish descent
 Marcus Asner (born 1969), lawyer, singer, father; mother is of Polish descent
 Joe Augustyn (born 1952), screenwriter, movie producer
 Jake T. Austin (born 1994), actor; father is of part Polish descent
 Pat Benatar (born 1953), singer and composer
 Carroll Baker (born 1931), film actress and author; father of Polish ancestry
 Christine Baranski (born 1952), actress
 Kristen Bell (born 1980), film/television actress (Veronica Mars), mother is of Polish descent
 Maria Bello (born 1967), actress (A History of Violence, Thank You for Smoking, The Cooler); mother is of Polish descent
 Brian Benben (born 1956), television actor; father was of Polish descent
 Jack Benny (1894–1974), comedian, vaudevillian, and actor for radio, television, and film; of Polish Jewish descent
 Carlos Bernard (né Carlos Bernard Papierski; born 1962), actor (24)
 Craig Bierko (born 1964), actor and singer; father has Polish ancestry
 Rebecca Black (born 1997), singer, father of partial Polish descent
 Marc Blucas (born 1972), actor; paternal grandfather of Polish descent
 Jon Bon Jovi (born 1962), singer-songwriter, actor, producer, and philanthropist; maternal grandfather of Polish descent
 Alex Borstein (born 1971), actress, voice actress, writer, and comedian; of Polish Jewish descent
 Lisa Boyle (born 1968), actress and model; of part Polish descent
 Andrew Bryniarski (born 1969), actor and bodybuilder; father of Polish descent
 Carolina Bartczak (born 1985), actress; born in Germany, both parents are Polish
 Amanda Bynes (born 1986), actress and comedian; paternal grandmother was of Polish descent
 Liz Cackowski (born 1975), comedy writer and actress; of part Polish descent
 Nicolas Cage (born 1964), actor; maternal grandmother was of Polish descent (surname Siputa)
 Bobby Campo (born 1983), actor; paternal grandmother of Polish descent
 Steve Carell (born 1962), actor; mother of Polish descent
 Jessica Cauffiel (born 1976), actress and singer; paternal grandmother of Polish ancestry
 Jennifer Connelly (born 1970), Academy Award-winning actress; her mother was of Russian Jewish and Polish Jewish descent
 Robert Conrad (1935–2020; né Conrad Robert Falk), film and television actor; Polish on father (Leonard Falkowski)'s side
 D.J. Cotrona (born 1980), actor; mother of half Polish descent
 Elżbieta Czyżewska (1938–2010), Polish-born award-winning theater, film and TV actress
 Larry David (born 1947), comedian, writer, actor, director, and television producer; mother was of Polish descent.
 Jenna Dewan-Tatum (born 1980), actress, model, and dancer; paternal grandmother of Polish descent
 Janice Dickinson (born 1955), model/reality television star; mother was of Polish descent
 James Charles Dickinson (born 1999), YouTuber, model, make-up artist, Internet personality; father is of Polish descent 
 Dagmara Dominczyk (born 1976), Polish-born American actress; sister of Marika Dominczyk
 Marika Dominczyk (born 1980), Polish-born American actress; sister of Dagmara Dominczyk
 David Duchovny (born 1960), actor, paternal grandmother of Polish ancestry
 Anne Dudek (born 1975), television actress (Mad Men, House M.D.)
 Alexis Dziena (born 1984), film and television actress (When in Rome), of part Polish descent
 George Dzundza (born 1945), actor, of part Polish descent
 Zac Efron (born 1987), actor, paternal grandfather was the son of Polish Jewish parents
 Jesse Eisenberg (born 1983), actor, of Polish Jewish and Ukrainian Jewish descent
 Linda Emond (born 1959), actress; paternal grandmother was of Polish descent
 Briana Evigan (born 1986), actress; of part Polish descent
 Peter Falk (1927–2011), actor; of Polish Jewish descent
 Jason David Frank (born 1973), actor and mixed martial artist; mother of half Polish descent
 Johnny Galecki (born 1975), actor; father of Polish descent
 Arlene Golonka (1936–2021), actress
 Katerina Graham (born 1989), actress (Vampire Diaries), mother of Polish  and Russian Jewish descent
 Gilda Gray (1901–1959), actress and dancer
 Ari Graynor (born 1983), actress; father of Polish descent
 Alice Greczyn (born 1986), actress
 Kim Greist (born 1958), actress; Polish maternal grandmother
 Zach Grenier (born 1954), actor; mother of Polish descent
 Sasha Grey (born 1988), actress; maternal great-grandfather of Polish descent
 Khrystyne Haje (born 1968), actress
 Chelsea Handler (born 1975), actress and comedian; maternal great-grandmother of Polish origin
 Elisabeth Hasselbeck (born 1977), co-host of The View and contestant on Survivor
 Izabella Scorupco (born 1970), actress
 Marilu Henner (born 1952), television actress (Taxi) and health book author; father was of Polish descent
 John Hodiak (1914–1955), film actor
 Bonnie Hunt (born 1961), Golden Globe- and Emmy Award-nominated actress, comedian, writer, director, television producer and daytime television host, maternal grandparents were Polish
 Ryan Hurst (born 1976), actor; mother of Polish descent
 Scarlett Johansson (born 1984), actress (Lost in Translation); mother is of Polish descent
 Jake Johnson (born 1978), actor; maternal grandmother, Lucille/Lucy Kopacz, was of Polish descent
 Angelina Jolie (born 1975), Academy Award-winning film actress; mother was approximately 1 quarter Polish
 Jenny Jones (born 1946), talk show host who hosted The Jenny Jones Show from 1991 to 2002
 Jane Kaczmarek (born 1955), Emmy-nominated actress Malcolm in the Middle and Raising the Bar
 Nina Kaczorowski (born 1975), actress, stunt woman, model and dancer
 John Karlen (1933–2020), Emmy Award-winning stage, film, and television actor (Dark Shadows, Cagney & Lacey)
 Vincent Kartheiser (born 1979), actor; maternal great-grandmother was Polish, from Błonie
 Harvey Keitel (born 1939), Academy Award-nominated actor, of Polish Jewish and Romanian Jewish descent
 Ted Knight (1923–1986), Emmy Award-winning film and television actor (The Mary Tyler Moore Show, Too Close for Comfort)
 Victoria Konefal (born 1996), TV actor (Days of Our Lives)
 Kristof Konrad (born 1962), TV and film actor (Red Sparrow, House of Cards)
 Camille Kostek (born 1992), actress and model
 Mitchell Kowal (1915–1971), film actor
 Linda Kozlowski (born 1958), film actress (Crocodile Dundee)
 Jane Krakowski (born 1968), film, stage and television actress (Ally McBeal, 30 Rock); winner of the 2003 Tony Award; of three quarters Polish descent
 John Krasinski (born 1979), TV and film actor (The Office); of half Polish and half Irish descent
 Cheslie Kryst (1991–2022), Miss USA 2019, father is of Polish descent
 Lisa Kudrow (born 1963), actress, of Polish Jewish and Belarusian Jewish descent
 Shia LaBeouf (born 1986), actor, voice actor, and comedian, mother is of Polish Jewish and Russian Jewish descent
 Lisa Lampanelli (born 1961), comedian and actress; maternal grandfather, Stanley Velgot, of Polish descent
 Carole Landis (1919–1948), film actress; mother was of Polish descent and father of Norwegian descent
 Joe Lando (born 1961), TV and film actor (Dr. Quinn, Medicine Woman)
 Matt Lanter (born 1983), actor and model; of part Polish descent
 Téa Leoni (born 1966), film and TV actress; paternal grandmother was of Polish descent
 Logan Lerman (born 1992), actor; his maternal grandfather was a Polish Jewish immigrant, and the rest of Logan's ancestry is Russian Jewish, Lithuanian Jewish, and other Polish Jewish
 Justin Long (born 1978), film and television actor; his mother, former Broadway actress Wendy Lesniak, is of half Polish descent
 Brittney Karbowski (born 1986), voice actress
 Josh Lucas (born 1971), actor
 Eric Mabius (born 1971), TV and film actor (Ugly Betty, The Crow), mother is of Polish descent
 Richard "Mach" Machowicz, host of Discovery Channel's Future Weapons, former Navy SEAL
 Rose Marie (1923–2017), TV and film actress (The Dick Van Dyke Show); mother of Polish heritage and father of Italian descent
 Ross Martin (1920–1981), Polish Jewish immigrant, TV and film actor (Wild Wild West)
 Joseph Mazzello (born 1983), actor; maternal grandfather of Polish descent
 Jenny McCarthy (born 1972), actress and comedian; mother of part Polish descent
 Izabella Miko (born 1981), Polish-American actress and dancer
 Patrycja Mikula (born 1983), also known as Patricia Mikula, model and Playboy Cybergirl
 Wentworth Miller (born 1972), actor, model, screenwriter, and producer; maternal great-grandmother, Florence Busczniewicz, of Polish descent
 Christopher Mintz-Plasse (born 1989), actor; paternal grandmother, Joan Stolarczyk, was of Polish descent
 Helena Modjeska (1840–1909), Polish-born actress who specialized in Shakespearean roles
 Cameron Monaghan (born 1993), actor and model; mother of part Polish descent
 Kyle Mooney (born 1984), actor and comedian; maternal great-grandfather of Polish descent
 Zero Mostel (1915–1977), actor of stage and screen, of Polish Jewish descent
 Pola Negri (1897–1987), Polish film actress who achieved notoriety as a femme fatale in silent films between the 1910s and 1930s
 Paul Newman (1925–2008), actor; of Polish Jewish/Hungarian Jewish (paternal) and Slovak Catholic (maternal) descent.
 Charlie O'Connell (born 1975), reality and TV actor (The Bachelor)
 Jerry O'Connell (born 1974), TV and film actor; maternal grandfather was of Polish descent
 Jodi Lyn O'Keefe (born 1978), actress and model; of part Polish descent
 Jerry Orbach (1935–2004), Tony Award-winning stage, film, musical theatre and television actor and singer; mother was of Polish-Lithuanian Roman Catholic background; father was a German Jewish immigrant
 Frank Oz (born 1944), British-born American film director, actor and puppeteer, father was a Polish Jew
 Joanna Pacuła (born 1957), Polish-born actress
 Jared Padalecki (born 1982), actor (Gilmore Girls, Supernatural); father is of Polish descent
 Adrianne Palicki (born 1983), actress; paternal grandfather of Polish descent
 Gwyneth Paltrow (born 1972), actress; paternal family were Jewish immigrants from Belarus and Poland; grandfather's surname was "Paltrowicz"
 Annie Parisse (born 1975), actress; father of part Polish descent
 James Penzi (born 1952), playwright, screenwriter, poet; mother is Polish
 Kinga Philipps (born 1976), actress/producer
 Janelle Pierzina (born 1980), contestant on the sixth and All-Star seasons of the American version of the CBS reality show Big Brother
 Mary Kay Place (born 1947), actress and singer; Polish maternal great-grandmother
 Natalie Portman (born 1981), actress, part-Polish Jewish descent
 Stefanie Powers (born 1942), actress and singer; mother was of Polish descent
 Beata Pozniak (born 1960), Polish-born actress, film director, painter, fashion model and activist who is now based out of the United States (Babylon 5, JFK)
 Robert Prosky (1930–2008), TV and film actor (Hill Street Blues)
 Danny Pudi (born 1979), TV actor; mother is of Polish descent
 Maggie Q (born 1979), model and actress (Nikita, Mission: Impossible III, Die Hard 4.0); father is of Irish and Polish descent
 Jack Quaid (born 1992), actor; maternal grandfather of Polish ancestry
 John Ratzenberger (born 1947), TV actor (Cheers), mother was of Polish descent
 Dana Reeve (1961–2006), actress, singer, and activist for disability causes; paternal grandmother of Polish descent
 Scott Rogowsky (born 1984), comedian and the primary host of HQ Trivia.
 Eli Roth (born 1972), film director, producer, writer and actor, of Polish Jewish, Russian Jewish, and Austrian Jewish descent
 Ronda Rousey (born 1987), MMA fighter and actress; of part Polish descent
 Paul Rudd (born 1969), actor, of Polish Jewish and Russian Jewish descent
 Amy Ryan (born 1969), actress, born Amy Beth Dziewiontkowski; of part Polish descent
 Meg Ryan (born 1961), née Hyra, actress, Polish ancestry on her father's side
 Thomas Sadoski (born 1976), actor; paternal grandfather is of Polish descent
 Jonathan Sadowski (born 1979), actor of Polish and Italian descent
 Pat Sajak (born 1946, née Patrick Sajdak), host of the popular and long-running television game show Wheel of Fortune
 Fred Savage (born 1976), actor (The Wonder Years), of Polish Jewish and Russian Jewish descent
 Rob Schneider (born 1963), actor, comedian, screenwriter, and director; father was of Polish Jewish and Russian Jewish descent
 Liev Schreiber (born 1967), film and stage actor, mother is of Polish Jewish descent
 Chloë Sevigny (born 1974), film actress and model; mother is of Polish descent
 Atticus Shaffer (born 1998), actor; maternal grandmother, Wanda Mary Jankowski, of Polish descent
 Casey Siemaszko (born 1961), film/television actor, Polish father
 Nina Siemaszko (born 1970), film/television actress, Polish father
 Joseph Sikora (born 1976), Polish-American actor (Boardwalk Empire, The Heart, She Holler, Power)
 Edyta Śliwińska (born 1982), television personality; ballroom dancer (Dancing with the Stars)
 Bill Smitrovich (born 1947), actor
 Leelee Sobieski (born 1982), actress, father is of partial Polish descent
 Olga Sosnovska (born 1972), Polish-born TV and soap opera actress (All My Children)
 Martin Starr (born 1982), actor; maternal great-grandmother, Mary H. Krzyzanowski, of Polish descent
 Howard Stern Radio and TV personality
 Jon Stewart (born 1962), host
 Ben Stiller (born 1965), actor, father is of Polish Jewish descent
 Gloria Swanson (1899–1983), actress (best known for Sunset Boulevard); mother, Adelaide Klainowksi, was of part Polish descent
 Loretta Swit (born 1937), musical theatre and television actress (M*A*S*H)
 Keith Szarabajka (born 1952), TV and film actor
 Eric Szmanda (born 1975), TV actor (CSI), of part Polish descent
 Christine Taylor (born 1971), actress; of part Polish descent
 Miles Teller (born 1987), actor; paternal great-grandmother, Catherine Stancavage, was of Polish descent
 Meghan Trainor (born 1993), singer and actress; maternal grandfather of Polish descent
 Alan Tudyk (born 1971), TV, film and stage actor; father of Polish descent
 Liv Tyler (born 1977), actress and model; paternal great-grandfather was a Polish immigrant
 Tom Tyler (1903–1954), film actor (Adventures of Captain Marvel)
 James Urbaniak (born 1963), film, television and theatre actor
 Travis Van Winkle (born 1982), actor; maternal grandmother of Polish descent
 Michael Vartan (born 1968), film and television actor; mother is a Jewish immigrant from Poland
 Jean Wallace (1923–1990), film actress
 Eli Wallach (1915–2014), actor, of Polish Jewish descent
 Devon Werkheiser (born 1991), actor; maternal great-grandmother was of Polish descent
 Paul Wesley (born 1982), actor, born Paweł Tomasz Wasilewski to Polish parents (Fallen, The Vampire Diaries)
 Steve Wilkos (born 1964), TV host
 Paul Winchell (1922–2005), ventriloquist, voice actor and comedian; his grandparents were Jewish immigrants from Poland and Austria-Hungary
 Alicia Witt (born 1975), actress, singer-songwriter, and pianist (paternal great-grandfather of Polish ancestry)
 Pia Zadora (born 1954), actress and singer; mother was of Polish descent
 Henry Zebrowski (born 1984), actor and comedian; grandfather was Polish immigrant
 Maddie Ziegler (born 2002), actress and dancer; of partial Polish descent
 Madeline Zima (born 1985), actress; maternal grandfather of Polish ancestry
 Vanessa Zima (born 1986), actress; maternal grandfather of Polish ancestry
 Yvonne Zima (born 1989), actress; maternal grandfather of Polish ancestry
 Sheri Moon Zombie (born 1970), actress; mother of Polish descent
 Daphne Zuniga (born 1962), actress; maternal grandfather of Polish descent
 Chris Zylka (born 1985), actor; maternal grandfather of Polish descent

Architects
 John S. Flizikowski (1868–1934), prominent Chicago architect
 Frank Gehry (born 1929), Canadian-born of Polish Jewish descent; California architect
 Norman Jaffe (1932–1993), architect widely noted for his contemporary residential architecture
 Daniel Libeskind (born 1946), Polish-born architect
 Elizabeth Plater-Zyberk (born 1950), Polish American leader of the New Urbanism movement
 Witold Rybczynski (born 1943), Scottish-born architect, author and professor; later based in Canada and the United States

Artists

 Richard Anuszkiewicz (1930–2020), painter, sculptor, and printmaker
 Joseph Bakos (aka Jozef Bakos; 1891–1977), Southwestern artist
 Władysław T. Benda (1873–1948), painter and illustrator
 Hedwig Gorski (born 1949), performance poet and avant-garde artist
 Frank Kozik, graphic artist who has worked with Nirvana, Pearl Jam, Stone Temple Pilots, the Red Hot Chili Peppers, Melvins, The Offspring and Butthole Surfers; runs Man's Ruin Records
 Tamara de Lempicka (1898–1980), art deco artist
 Jan Lorenc (born 1954), photographer and designer
 Jozef Mazur (1897–1970), painter and stained glass artist
 Rafał Olbiński (born 1945), artist
 Ed Paschke (1939–2004), artist
 Miroslaw Rogala (born 1954), video artist
 Theodore Roszak (1907–1981), sculptor
 Jan Sawka (1946–2012), painter, sculptor, printmaker, stage design, and set design
 Kesha Sebert (born 1987), singer
 David Seymour (1911–1956), Polish-born photographer and photojournalist
 Julian Stanczak (1928–2017), painter
 Stanisław Szukalski (1893–1987), painter, sculptor and pseudoscientific historian
 Arthur Szyk (1894–1951), political cartoonist
 Jack Tworkov (1900–1982), painter
 Piotr Uklański, artist and photographer
 Jurek Wajdowicz (born 1951), photographer, artist and graphic designer
 Max Weber (1881–1961), Polish-born Expressionist painter
 Krzysztof Wodiczko (born 1943), artist
 Korczak Ziolkowski (1908–1982), sculptor of Crazy Horse Memorial

Authors
 George Adamski (1891–1965), author
 Douglas Blazek (born 1941), poet and editor
 Charles Bukowski (1920–1994), writer
 Virginia C. Bulat (1938–1986), author and historian
 Mark Z. Danielewski (born 1966), author (House of Leaves)
 Stuart Dybek (born 1942), poet, writer
 Marie Ferrarella (born 1948), author
 Hedwig Gorski (born 1949), performance poet, avant-garde artist
 John Guzlowski (born 1948), poet/novelist/essayist, author (Echoes of Tattered Tongues, Suitcase Charlie)
 Christopher Kasparek (born 1945), author, historian, translator
 Chuck Klosterman (born 1972), author with German and Polish ancestry
 Lelord Kordel (1904–2001), author of books on nutrition and healthy living
 Jerzy Kosinski (1933–1991), novelist
 Chris Kuzneski (born 1969), best-selling author of multiple thrillers (Sign of the Cross, The Lost Throne)
 Richard C. Lukas (born 1937), author, historian and freelance writer
 Czesław Miłosz (1911–2004), Nobel Prize–winning poet, prose writer, essayist and translator
 Andrew Nagorski (born 1947), non-fiction/fiction author and award-winning senior editor of Newsweek magazine
 Michael Alfred Peszke (1932–2015), psychiatrist and historian of the Polish Armed Forces in World War II
 David Pietrusza (born 1949), non-fiction and historical author
 Julie Ann Racino (born 1953), nonfiction author in education, science, disability and public administration; 3rd generation Polish American
 Chez Raginiak (born 1960), author
 James Rollins (born 1961; né Czajkowski), bestselling author of fantasy and action-adventure thrillers (Sandstorm, Map of Bones)
 Leo Rosten (1908–1997), teacher and academic; best known as a humorist in the fields of scriptwriting, storywriting, journalism and Yiddish lexicography
 Maurice Sendak (1928–2012), Polish Jewish-American writer and illustrator of children's books
 Isaac Bashevis Singer (1902–1991), Polish-American writer in Yiddish, awarded the Nobel Prize in Literature in 1978.
 Maja Trochimczyk (born 1957), music historian, poet, editor, translator and publisher, founder of Moonrise Press
 Diane Wakoski (born 1937), poet and essayist in residence at Michigan State University
 Maia Wojciechowska (1927–2002), writer of children's books
 Leo Yankevich (1961–2018), critic, editor, poet and translator associated with the New Formalist movement
 Adam Zamoyski (born 1949), historian and a member of the Zamoyski ancient Polish nobility family
 George Zebrowski (born 1945), science fiction author
 Roger Zelazny (1937–1995), writer of fantasy and science fiction short stories and novels
 Aleksandra Ziółkowska-Boehm (born 1949), academic and non-fiction and historical author

Filmmakers
 Joe Augustyn (born 1952), screenwriter, producer (Night of the Demons)
 Andrzej Bartkowiak (born 1950), cinematographer, director and actor
 Richard Boleslavsky (1889–1937), director (The Painted Veil)
 Mark Cendrowski, television director
 Shirley Clarke (1919–1997), experimental and independent filmmaker
 Tad Danielewski (1921–1993), director/producer; his first wife was Polish-American actress Sylvia Daneel, with whom he emigrated to the United States
 Max Fleischer (1883–1972), Polish-American cartoonist, filmmaker and creator of Koko the Clown, Betty Boop, Popeye, and Superman, of Jewish descent
 Samuel Goldwyn (1879–1974), Polish-born U.S. Hollywood motion picture producer and founding contributor of several motion picture studios, of Jewish descent
 Gene Gutowski (1925–2016), Polish-born European and U.S. motion picture and theater producer, noted sculptor and author. Producer of several of Roman Polanski's early films. Co-producer of The Pianist.
 Janusz Kamiński (born 1959), two-time-Oscar-winning cinematographer and film director who has photographed all of Steven Spielberg's movies since Schindler's List (1993)
 Stanley Kubrick (1928–1999), US/UK filmmaker, screenwriter, producer and photographer, of Jewish descent
 Martin Kunert, writer/director (Campfire Tales, MTV's Fear, Voices of Iraq)
 Rudolph Maté (1898–1964), cinematographer and film director
 Alan J. Pakula (1928–1998), producer, writer and director (Sophie's Choice), of Jewish descent
 Roman Polanski (born 1933), filmmaker born in France; at age 3 moved to Poland; fled from the U.S. to France in 1978 due to allegations of statutory rape, of Jewish descent
 Anthony Stanislas Radziwill (1959–1999), television executive/filmmaker
 Zbigniew Rybczyński (born 1949), director, filmmaker, cinematographer, Oscar winner 1983 Best Animated Short Film
 Andrzej Sekuła (born 1954), cinematographer and film director
 Aaron Spelling (1923–2006), film and television producer, of Jewish descent
 Sam Spiegel (1901–1985), Academy Award-winning film producer, of Jewish descent
 J. Michael Straczynski (born 1954), writer/producer (Babylon 5 franchise)
 Gore Verbinski (born 1964), director (Pirates of the Caribbean (all 3 films), The Mexican, The Ring)
 Lana Wachowski (born 1965), filmmaker, director (The Matrix, V for Vendetta)
 Lilly Wachowski (born 1967), filmmaker, director (The Matrix, V for Vendetta)
 Albert Warner (1883–1967), co-founder of Warner Bros. Studios, of Jewish descent
 Harry Warner (1881–1958), one of the founders of Warner Bros. and a major contributor to the development of the film industry, of Jewish descent
 Jack L. Warner (1892–1978), president and driving force behind the highly successful development of Warner Bros. Studios in Hollywood, of Jewish descent
 Sam Warner (1887–1927), co-founder and chief executive officer of Warner Bros. film company, of Jewish descent
 Billy Wilder (1906–2002), journalist, screenwriter, film director, and producer whose career spanned more than 50 years and 60 films, of Jewish descent
 Tommy Wiseau, writer, director, and star of The Room
 Dariusz Wolski, Polish-born cinematographer (Pirates of the Caribbean, The Crow, A Perfect Murder, Crimson Tide)

Journalists

 Mika Brzezinski (born 1967), NBC and MSNBC News journalist and commentator
 Wolf Blitzer (born 1948). CNN anchor, born in Augsburg, Allied-occupied Germany to Polish-Jewish survivors from Auschwitz
 Rita Cosby (born 1964), MSNBC anchor; journalist
 Christopher Hitchens, literary critic and political activist
 Laura Ingraham (born 1964), conservative political TV commentator/radio show host/author
 Wanda Jablonski (1920–1992), journalist
 Larry King (1933–2021), Larry King Live, of Jewish descent
 John Kobylt, radio personality and co-host of talk radio program John and Ken on KFI AM 640 (Los Angeles, California)
 Max Kolonko, TV personality, news correspondent, author, producer
 Steve Kornacki, national political correspondent for NBC News
 Michelle Kosinski (born 1974), NBC News correspondent
 Alan Krashesky, anchorman of Chicago's WLS-TV or ABC 7
Samuel Lubell (1911–1987), print journalist, pollster, and National Book Award finalist
 Jim Miklaszewski, chief Pentagon correspondent for NBC News
 Carl Monday, investigative journalist in Cleveland
 Mike Royko (1932–1997), long-time Chicago newspaper columnist
 Wilma Smith (née Pokorny), anchorwoman WJW-TV
 Gloria Steinem (born 1934), American feminist icon, journalist, and social and political activist, of partial Jewish descent
 Barbara Walters (1929–2022), broadcast journalist and television personality 
 Ivo Widlak (born 1978), Polish-born international press, radio and television journalist

Models

 Alessandra Ambrosio (born 1981), model and actress
 Anna Chudoba (born 1978), model/reality TV star
 Janice Dickinson (born 1955), self-proclaimed first supermodel, fashion photographer, actress, author and an agent
 Katarzyna Dolinska (born 1986), model and contestant of America's Next Top Model, Cycle 10
 Alice Greczyn (born 1986), model and actress
 Jacquelyn Jablonski (born 1991), model
 Anna Jagodzińska (born 1987), Polish model, born in Sierpc
 Diane Klimaszewski (born 1971), model and one half of the Coors Light Twins with sister Elaine
 Elaine Klimaszewski (born 1971), model and one half of the Coors Light Twins with sister Diane
 Karlie Kloss (born 1992), model
 Camille Kostek (born 1992), model, actress, and host; was on the cover of the Sports Illustrated Swimsuit Issue
 Joanna Krupa (born 1981), model and actress, born in Warsaw
 Jordan Monroe (born 1986), Playboy model
 Beth Ostrosky Stern (born 1972), model and wife of Howard Stern
 Emily Ratajkowski (born 1991), Polish-American model who appeared on iCarly
 Anja Rubik (born 1983), Polish model, born in Rzeszów
 Mia Tyler (born 1978), plus-size model, actress, public speaker and advocate; great-grandfather emigrated from Poland

Musicians

 Esther Allan (1914–1985), composer, pianist, and organist
 Rosalie Allen (1924–2003), country singer-songwriter, and guitarist
 Michael Anthony (born 1954), né Michael Anthony Sobolewski; bassist (Van Halen)
 Jerry Augustyniak (born 1958), drummer (10,000 Maniacs)
 Pat Benatar (born 1953), née Patricia Mae Andrzejewski, rock singer ("Heartbreaker", "Hit Me With Your Best Shot", "Love Is A Battlefield")
 Bhad Bhabie (born 2003), rapper, songwriter and internet personality. Has Jewish Polish ancestry on her father's side.
 Eddie Blazonczyk (1941–2012), polka musician
 Mike Bordin (born 1962), drummer for (Faith No More)
 Dan Bryk, (born 1970), singer-songwriter
 Porcelain Black (born 1985), singer-songwriter, rapper, and model; mother of Polish descent
 Clem Burke (born 1954), drummer (Blondie)
 Peter Cetera (born 1944), singer-songwriter, bassist (Chicago)
 Greyson Chance (born 1997), singer-songwriter, and pianist; maternal great-grandmother, Annie J. Kosinski, of Polish descent
 Leonard Chess (né Lejzor Szmuel Czyż; 1917–1969), co-founder of Chess Records
 Phil Chess (né Fiszel Czyż; 1921–2016), co-founder of Chess Records
"Metal" Mike Chlasciak (born 1971), guitarist of Halford, Cans and PainmuseuM
 Florian Chmielewski (born 1927), Minnesota musician; politician; former legislator; former President of the Minnesota Senate
 John Curulewski (1950–1988), one of the original members of Styx
 Dick Dale (1937–2019), pioneer of surf rock and one of the most influential guitarists of the early 1960s; experimented with reverb and made use of custom made Fender amplifiers
 Neil Diamond (born 1941), singer-songwriter, born to a Jewish family descended from Russian and Polish immigrants
 Sławomir Dobrzański (born 1968), classical pianist
 Henry Doktorski (born 1956), accordionist, pianist, composer and conductor
 Urszula Dudziak (born 1943), jazz singer
 Adam Dutkiewicz (born 1977), guitarist (Killswitch Engage)
 Rik Fox (born 1955; né Richard Suligowski), heavy metal bass/guitar player (Steeler, W.A.S.P); also actor and published writer
 Piotr Gajewski (born 1959), conductor, music director (National Philharmonic)
 Tamara Gee (born 1972), pop singer-songwriter
 Paul Gilbert (born 1966), guitarist (Mr. Big, Racer X)
 Leopold Godowsky (1870–1938), Polish-born pianist/composer
 Benny Goodman (1909–1986), jazz musician, clarinetist and bandleader, known as "King of Swing", "Patriarch of the Clarinet", "The Professor", and "Swing's Senior Statesman; of Polish Jewish descent
 Lawrence Gwozdz (born 1953), saxophone player
 Donnie Hamzik (born 1956), heavy metal drummer and original member of Manowar, of Polish descent, born Dominik Hamzik
 Josef Hofmann (1876–1957), Polish-born pianist and composer
 Mieczysław Horszowski (1892–1993), Polish-born pianist
 Frank Iero (born 1981), guitarist for the band (My Chemical Romance)
 Walter Jagiello (1930–2006), polka musician; akas: "Mały Władziu", "Li'l Wally", "The Polka King"
 Jill Janus (1975–2018), heavy metal singer and frontperson of Huntress, born Jill Janiszewska
 Sarah Jarosz (born 1991), singer-songwriter
 Bobby Jarzombek (born 1963), drummer (Halford)
 Ron Jarzombek, guitarist (Watchtower)
 JoJo (born 1990), pop and R&B singer-songwriter; actress
 Jan A. P. Kaczmarek (born 1953), Academy Award-winning composer
 Kesha (born 1987), pop singer 
 Greg Kihn (born 1949), pop musician, frontman (The Greg Kihn Band)
 Pee Wee King (1914–2000), country-western singer and songwriter ("Tennessee Waltz")
 Jake Kiszka (born 1996), guitarist (Greta Van Fleet)
 Josh Kiszka (born 1996), frontman (Greta Van Fleet)
 Sam Kiszka (born 1999), bassist (Greta Van Fleet)
 Frank Klepacki (born 1974), musician, video game music composer and sound director
 Miliza Korjus (1909–1980), Polish-born opera singer and Academy Award-nominated actress
 Adam Kowalczyk (born 1975), guitar player (Live)
 Ed Kowalczyk (born 1971), vocalist (Live)
 Gene Krupa (1909–1973), big band and jazz drummer
 Jan Lewan (born 1941), polka band leader
 Liberace (1919–1987), entertainer of Polish and Italian descent
 Karl Logan (born 1965) heavy metal guitarist and member of Manowar, born Carl Mozelewski
 Adam Makowicz (born 1940), jazz pianist and composer
 Ray Manzarek (né Manczarek; 1939–2013), The Doors keyboardist and co-founder
 Marilyn Mazur (born 1955), percussionist/composer/singer/pianist/bandleader
 Paul Mazurkiewicz (born 1968), drummer (Cannibal Corpse)
 Robert Muczynski (1929–2010), composer
 Karen O (born 1978), née Karen Lee Orzolek, singer (Yeah Yeah Yeahs)
 Benjamin Orr (né Benjamin Orzechowski, 1947–2000), lead singer and bassist (The Cars)
 Ken Peplowski (born 1959), jazz clarinetist and saxophonist
 Christina Perri (born 1986), singer-songwriter
 Gene Pitney (1940–2006), singer-songwriter
 Poe (born 1968), née Anne Decatur Danielewski, singer-songwriter
 Bogdan Raczynski (born 1977), musician
 Frederic Rzewski (1938–2021), composer and pianist
 John Rzeznik (born 1965), guitarist and vocalist of Goo Goo Dolls
 Richie Sambora (born 1959), Bon Jovi guitarist
 Neil Sedaka, (born 1939) singer-songwriter
 Stevenson Sedgwick, composer, keyboard player (The Phantom Limbs), multi-instrumentalist, composer Black Ice
 Jacques Singer (1910–1980), conductor
 Matt Skiba (born 1976), singer and guitarist (Alkaline Trio, blink-182)
 Ruth Slenczynska (born 1925), pianist
 Hillel Slovak (1962–1988), Israeli-American musician; original guitarist and founding Igor Stravinsky of Red Hot Chili Peppers
 Walt Solek (1910–2005), polka musician
 Paul Stanley (born 1952; né Stanley Bert Eisen), Kiss singer and guitarist with Polish father
 Peter Steele (1962–2010; né Peter Thomas Ratajczyk), vocalist, bassist (Type O Negative)
 Zygmunt Stojowski (1870–1946), pianist and composer
 Leopold Stokowski (1882–1977), conductor and composer
Igor Stravinsky (1882–1971)  Polish blooded composer, widely considered the top 20th century composer who immigrated from Russia.
 Roman Totenberg (1911–2012), Polish-born violinist
 Thomas Tyra (1933–1995), college bandmaster, composer, arranger and music educator
 Steven Tyler (born 1948), lead singer for the rock band Aerosmith
 Michał Urbaniak (born 1943), Polish-born jazz musician
 Bobby Vinton (born 1935), pop singer
 Henryk Wars (1902–1977), composer
 Cory Wells (1941–2015; né Emil Lewandowski), born in Buffalo, New York; one of the three lead vocalists in the band Three Dog Night
 Jack White (born 1975), singer/guitarist for The White Stripes
 D'arcy Wretzky (born 1968), bassist (The Smashing Pumpkins)
 Franciszek Zachara (1898–1966), composer, pianist

Theater and dance
 Christine Baranski, stage, film and television actress (Tony, Emmy, Drama Desk award winner)
 Walter Bobbie (né Wladysław Babij), Broadway director
 Pesach Burstein (1896–1986), Polish-born Israeli-American actor, comedian, singer; director of Yiddish vaudeville/theatre (husband of Lillian Lux and father of Mike Burstyn)
 Mike Burstyn (born 1945), musical theatre actor; entertainer (son of Pesach Burstein and Lillian Lux)
 David Burtka (born 1975), stage actor
 John Gromada, Broadway composer and sound designer
 Jerry Jarrett (né Jerome Jaroslow), Broadway musical theatre actor
 Staś Kmieć, theater and dance choreographer
 Chloe Lukasiak (born 2001), dancer and reality television personality
 Lillian Lux (1918–2005), singer, author, songwriter and actress in Yiddish theater and Yiddish vaudeville; wife of Pesach Burstein; mother of Mike Burstyn
 Ida Nowakowska, actress, singer and dancer
 Mario Nugara, ballet dancer, director, instructor, born Pittsburgh, PA Italian/Polish descent, mother Irene Bober Nugara was Polish. 
 Eva Puck (1892−1979), vaudeville and Broadway star from the 1890s to the 1920s, mother was born in Poland.
 Anna Sokolow, leading American modern-dance choreographer, Broadway choreographer
 Zypora Spaisman, Lublin-born, U.S. stage actress (Yiddish Theatre); was midwife in Poland during World War II
 Marta Wittkowska, contralto operatic singer
 Karen Ziemba, Tony Award-winning actress, singer and dancer

Business and economics

 Darius Adamczyk, Polish-born CEO of Honeywell
 Drew Bartkiewicz, founder and CEO of lettrs
 Andrzej Beck, in 1983, he established his own firm, Eastport Trading
 Nathan Blecharczyk, co-founder and CSO of Airbnb
 Leonard Bosack, co-founder of Cisco Systems
 Paul Bragiel, internet entrepreneur 
 Maciej Cegłowski, web developer, entrepreneur. He is the owner of the bookmarking service Pinboard
 Brian Chesky, co-founder and CEO of Airbnb
 Jennifer Dulski, President and COO of Change.org
 Olga Erteszek, undergarment designer and lingerie company owner
 Max Factor, Sr., Polish-born cosmetics company founder
 Tony Fadell, American engineer, inventor, designer, entrepreneur, and angel investor. Known as "one of the fathers of the iPod"
 Andrew Filipowski, technology entrepreneur and founded Platinum Technology
 David Geffen, American record executive, film producer, theatrical producer and philanthropist
 Leo Gerstenzang, inventor of Q-Tips
 Alan Greenspan, economist; Chairman of the Federal Reserve of the United States, 1987-2006
 Joseph Grendys, chairman, CEO, president and owner od Koch Foods
 Ron Grzywinski,  co-founder of ShoreBank
 Nathan Handwerker, Polish-Jewish-American entrepreneur known for creating the Nathan's Famous brand of hot dogs
 Erazm Jerzmanowski, was an industrialist, philanthropist and patron of art
 Barbara Piasecka Johnson, humanitarian and art collector, who was one of the richest women in the world
 Henry Juszkiewicz, Chairman/CEO of Gibson Guitar Corporation
 Tom Kalinske, former president and CEO of Sega of America
 Chris Kempczinski, president and CEO of McDonald's Corporation.
 Marcin Kleczynski, CEO and co-founder of American Internet security company, Malwarebytes
 Adam Kolawa, was CEO and co-founder of Parasoft
 John Koza, computer scientist and co-founder of Scientific Games Corporation
 Dennis Kozlowski, former CEO of Tyco International, convicted in 2005 of fraud
 Anthony Levandowski, American self-driving car engineer. He co-founded Otto and Pronto AI
 Valeria Lipczynski, American businesswoman
 Hank Magnuski, co-founder and CEO of GammaLink, an early pioneer in PC-to-fax technology
 John Michael Małek, engineer, entrepreneur, real estate investor and developer and philanthropist
 Reuben and Rose Mattus, founders of the Häagen-Dazs company
 John Mojecki, businessman and community activist
 Edward Mosberg (1926-2022), Polish-American Holocaust survivor, real estate developer, educator, and philanthropist
 Luke Nosek co-founder of PayPal
 Edward P. Roski, real estate businessman; rated #163 on Forbes 400 Richest Americans (2008), with a net worth of approximately $2.5 billion
 Frank Piasecki, founder of Piasecki Helicopter Company, inventor of dual-rotor helicopters
 Edward Piszek, co-founded the Mrs. Paul's frozen foods brand
 Helena Rubinstein, Polish-born cosmetics company founder
 Lydia Sarfati, founder of the Repechage cosmetics company
 Martha Stewart (née Martha Kostyra; born 1941), business magnate, author, editor, former stockbroker, model, and homemaking advocate
 John J. Studzinski, investment banker and philanthropist
 John Stumpf, former chairman and CEO of Wells Fargo 
 Bob Stupak, founded Vegas World casino and the Stratosphere tower
 Peter Szulczewski, co-founder and CEO of Wish
 Jack Tramiel, founder of Commodore International; President and CEO of Atari Corporation
 Jan Waszkiewicz, co-founder of Randolph Engineering
 Sanford I. Weill, banker, philanthropist, CEO/Chairman of Citigroup
 Warren Winiarski, winemaker, stag leap winery
 Anne Wojcicki, co-founder of 23andMe, a personal genomics and biotechnology company
 Susan Wojcicki, senior vice president in charge of product management and engineering at Google
 Steve Wozniak, co-founder Apple Computer, Inc.
 Michael J. Wytrwal, one of the successful businessmen and entrepreneurs of the early 1900s in Amsterdam, New York
 Carl Yankowski, former CEO of Palm, Inc. and Ambient Devices
 Christian Brevoort Zabriskie, vice president of Pacific Coast Borax Company
 Felix Zandman, founder of Vishay Intertechnology 
 Wojciech Zaremba, co-founder of OpenAI
 Sam Zell, U.S.-born billionaire and real estate entrepreneur

Explorers
 John Scolvus (15th century), aka John of Cologneo, navigator (possibly the first Pole in the Americas)

Military

 
 Sylvester Antolak (1916–1944), U.S. Army sergeant, posthumously received the Medal of Honor
 Alexander Bielaski (1811–1861), Captain of the Union Army
 Leo J. Dulacki (1918–2019), U.S. Marine Corps lieutenant general whose last assignment was as the Deputy Chief of Staff for Manpower
 Gabby Gabreski (1919–2002), Francis Stanley "Gabby" Gabreski was a U.S. Army Air Corps and later U.S. Air Force officer who was a fighter ace in World War II, and again in Korea
Stephen R. Gregg (1914–2005), U.S. Army T/Sgt, received the Congressional Medal of Honor during World War II
 Ralph Ignatowski (1926–1945), awarded the Purple Heart with Gold Star, Presidential Unit Citation with Star, Asiatic-Pacific Campaign Medal, and the World War II Victory Medal
Appolonia Jagiello (1825–1866), Polish-Lithuainian revolutionary during the 1846 Kraków uprising and Hungarian Revolution, later immigrated to the United States.
 Jan Karski (1914–2000), Polish World War II resistance fighter and scholar
 Tadeusz Kościuszko (1746–1817), Polish and Lithuanian national hero, general and a leader of 1794 uprising (which bears his name) against the Russians
James Kowalski (born 1957) high ranking air force commander
 Włodzimierz Krzyżanowski (1824–1887), Polish military leader and a Union general in the American Civil War
 Donald J. Kutyna (born 1933), General, commander in chief of the North American Aerospace Defense Command and the United States Space Command from 1990 to 1992, and commander of Air Force Space Command at Peterson Air Force Base, Colorado from 1987 to 1990
 Robert J. Modrzejewski (born 1934), U.S. Marine and Medal of Honor Recipient for conspicuous gallantry in Vietnam
 Richard F. Natonski (born 1951), U.S. Marine Corps lieutenant general whose last assignment was as the Commander of U.S. Marine Corps Forces Command.
 Kazimierz Pułaski (1745–1779), Polish soldier and politician; has been called "the father of American cavalry"; from 1777, until his death, he fought in the American Revolutionary War for the independence of the U.S. Awarded honorary U.S. citizenship in 2009.
 Hyman G. Rickover (1900–1986), U.S. Navy Admiral; known as the "father of the Nuclear Navy"; first Director of Naval Reactors
 Edward Rowny (1917–2017), U.S. Army General and ambassador, Chief U.S. Negotiator for Arms Control
 John Shalikashvili (1936–2011), U.S. Army general and Chairman of the Joint Chiefs of Staff; born in Warsaw, Poland and emigrated to the U.S. as a teenager; became the first draftee to rise to rank of General and first JCS Chairman after General Colin Powell
 Frank P. Witek (1921–1944), U.S. Marine and Medal of Honor recipient

Politics

 Anna Maria Anders (born 1950), Polish politician and diplomat
 Mark Begich, United States senator from Alaska, 2009-2015
 Michael Bennet, United States senator from Colorado, mother of Polish descent
 Dan Benishek (born 1952), physician; U.S. Representative for Michigan's 1st congressional district (R-MI)
 A. Bruce Bielaski, director of the Bureau of Investigation (now the Federal Bureau of Investigation)
 Jackie Biskupski, politician and businesswoman from Utah
 Michael Bloomberg (born 1942), businessman and politician, and the former Mayor of New York City, paternal grandfather was a Polish Jew
 Zbigniew Brzezinski (1928–2017), Polish-American political scientist, geostrategist, and statesman
 Susan Bysiewicz (born 1961), Lt. Governor, Connecticut
 John D. Cherry (born 1951), Lt. Governor, Michigan
 Florian Chmielewski (born 1927), Minnesota musician; politician; former legislator; former President of the Minnesota Senate
 Andrew R. Ciesla (born 1953), State Senator, New Jersey, Republican
 Mark Critz, U.S. Congressman
 Ed Derwinski (1926–2012), former U.S. Secretary of Veteran Affairs
 John Dingell (1926–2019), former Democratic representative from Michigan
John Dingell Sr. (1894–1955), former Democratic representative from Michigan 
 Thaddeus J. Dulski (1915–1988), U.S. House of Representatives, New York
 Kendel Ehrlich (born 1961), former first lady of Maryland
 Renee Ellmers (born 1964) U.S. Representative for  since 2011.
 Dianne Feinstein, United States senator from California, paternal grandparents of Polish Jewish descent
Barry Goldwater (1909–1998), former U.S. Senator from Arizona (R-AZ) and 1964 Republican presidential nominee.
 John A. Gronouski (1919–1996), Postmaster General and ambassador
 Chuck Hagel, United States senator (R-NE); U.S. Secretary of Defense
 Kyle Janek (born 1958), Texas State Senator
 Leon Jaworski (1905–1982), special prosecutor during the Watergate scandal
 Mike Johanns, United States senator
 Lazarus Joseph (1891–1966), NY State Senator and New York City Comptroller
 Paul E. Kanjorski (born 1937), Pennsylvania Congressman, Democrat
 Marcy Kaptur (born 1946), U.S. Representative for the Ninth Congressional District of Ohio, Democrat
 Casimir Kendziorski (1898–1974), Wisconsin State Senate (1949–74)
 Jerry Kleczka (1943–2017), United States House of Representatives from 1985 to 2005, representing the Fourth Congressional District of Wisconsin
 Douglas Kmiec (born 1951), U.S. Ambassador (2009-2011), U.S. Assistant Attorney General (1988-1989) (OLC), legal scholar
 Ted Kulongoski (born 1940), Governor of Oregon
 Raymond Lesniak (born 1946), New Jersey State Senator
 Corey Lewandowski (born 1973) Lobbyist and campaign manager of Donald Trump's 2016 campaign for President of the United States
 Bill Lipinski (born 1937), United States House of Representatives (D-IL) from 1983 to 2005, representing the 3rd District of Illinois; father of Dan Lipinski
 Dan Lipinski (born 1966), member of the United States House of Representatives (D-IL), representing the 3rd District of Illinois; son of Bill Lipinski
 George D. Maziarz (born 1953), Republican state senator from New York's 62nd district
 Barbara Mikulski (born 1936), Senior United States senator (D-MD)
 Frank Murkowski (born 1933), former United States senator and Governor (Republican); father of Lisa Murkowski
 Lisa Murkowski (born 1957), Junior United States senator from Alaska; first U.S. Senator born in Alaska; Alaska's first female senator (Republican); daughter of Frank Murkowski
 Christopher Murphy (born 1973), United States senator (D-CT); mother of Polish descent
 Edmund Muskie (1914–1996), Democratic politician from Maine, served as Governor of Maine, a U.S. Senator, as U.S. Secretary of State, and ran as a candidate for Vice President of the United States
Jan Nowak-Jeziorański (1914–2005) Polish patriot, journalist, resistance fighter, and security adviser under Carter, and Reagan.
 Marian P. Opala (1921–2010), Oklahoma Supreme Court Justice
 Tim Pawlenty (born 1960), Governor of Minnesota, Republican
 Ed Pawlowski, Mayor of Allentown, Pennsylvania 
 Gene Pelowski (born 1952), Representative in the Minnesota State Legislature for District 31A; schoolteacher (Winona Senior High School, Winona, Minnesota)
 Władysław Pleszczyński, conservative editor and writer
 Adam Przeworski (born 1940), Professor of Political Science
 Jen Psaki (born 1978), White House Press Secretary under President Biden, of Irish, Greek and Polish descent
 Roman Pucinski (1919–2002), House of Representatives, Illinois
 Nicholas Andrew Rey (1938–2009), United States Ambassador to Poland from 1993 to 1997
 Dan Rostenkowski (1928–2010), served in the U.S. Congress as a U.S. Representative from 1959 to 1995 (D-IL)
 Susan Sadlowski Garza (born 1959), member of the Chicago City Council
 Bernie Sanders (born 1941), United States senator from Vermont, mother was of Polish Jewish descent 
 Scott Stringer (born 1960), New York City Comptroller and Borough President of Manhattan
 Bart Stupak (born 1952), former U.S. Representative (D-MI)
 Richard Trumka, American labor movement leader
 Alexander Vershbow, United States Ambassador to South Korea
 Jackie Walorski, United States Representative (R-IN), representing the 2nd district of Indiana's 2nd congressional district
 Aldona Wos, United States Ambassador to Estonia until 2006
 Marion Zioncheck (1901–1936), United States House of Representatives from 1933 to 1936

Religion
 Paul Gregory Bootkoski (born 1940), Bishop of Metuchen, New Jersey
 Fabian Bruskewitz (born 1935), Bishop of Lincoln, Nebraska
 Franciszek Chalupka (died 1909), Polish priest, graduate of Orchard Lake Seminary, founder of the first Polish parishes in New England, started from 1887
 Walter Ciszek (1904–1984), Jesuit priest held by the Soviet Union for 23 years, between 1941 and 1963
 Józef Dąbrowski (1842–1903), Catholic priest
 William A. Dembski (born 1960), Episcopalian; prominent proponent of intelligent design
 Edward Kmiec (1936–2020), Bishop of Buffalo, New York
 John Cardinal Krol (1910–1996), Archbishop of Philadelphia
 Jerome Edward Listecki (born 1949), Archbishop of Milwaukee, Wisconsin
 Adam Cardinal Maida (born 1930), Archbishop of Detroit, Michigan
 David Miscavige (born 1960), chairman of the board of Religious Technology Center (RTC), a corporation that controls the trademarked names and symbols of Dianetics and Scientology, and controls the copyrighted teachings of Scientology founder L. Ron Hubbard
 Leopold Moczygemba (1824–1891), Franciscan, founder of the first Polish settlement in Panna Maria, Texas
 Thomas J. Paprocki (born 1952), Roman Catholic Bishop of Springfield, Illinois
 Edmund Cardinal Szoka (1927–2014), former president of the Pontifical Commission for Vatican City State and Governor of Vatican City
 Thomas Wenski (born 1950), Bishop of Orlando, Florida
 David Zubik (born 1949), Roman Catholic Bishop of Pittsburgh

Scientists

 Victor Ambros (born 1953), developmental biologist who discovered the first known microRNA (miRNA).
 Henryk Arctowski (1871–1958), scientist, oceanographer and Antarctica explorer
 Julius Axelrod (1912–2004), biochemist
 Paul Baran (1926–2011), Internet pioneer, one of the developers of packet-switched networks along with Donald Davies and Leonard Kleinrock
 Mieczysław G. Bekker (1905–1989), engineer and scientist; inventor of the lunar rover
 Karol J. Bobko (born 1937), former NASA astronaut
 William J. Borucki In charge of NASA Kepler mission.
 Jozef Cywinski (born 1936), biomedical engineer; developed several first-on-the market electro-medical devices like cardiac stimulators pacemakers, train-of-four nerve stimulators, PACS, EMS, TENS and Veinoplus calf pump stimulators
 Ewa Deelman, computer scientist
 Stanley Dudrick (1935–2020), surgeon behind total parenteral nutrition
 Elonka Dunin (born 1958), game developer, writer, and amateur cryptographer; maintains a website dedicated to the Kryptos sculpture/cipher located at the CIA's headquarters
 Andrzej Ehrenfeucht (born 1932), mathematician and computer scientist; formulated the Ehrenfeucht–Fraïssé game and Ehrenfeucht–Mycielski sequence
 Kazimierz Fajans (1887–1975), pioneer in the science of radioactivity; created Fajans' rules; discovered the element protactinium
 Christopher Ferguson (born 1961), former NASA astronaut
 Richard Feynman (1918–1988), physicist; 1965 Nobel Prize in Physics
 Casimir Funk (1884–1967), biochemist, generally credited with the first formulation of the concept of vitamins in 1912
 Michael Genesereth (born 1948), logician and computer scientist
 Walter Golaski (1913–1996), engineer
 Joanna Hoffman, part of the original Apple Macintosh developer team; acted as the team's only marketing person for more than a year; wrote the first draft of the Macintosh User Interface Guidelines
 Roald Hoffmann (born 1937), chemist and writer, Nobel Prize winner (1981)
 Josef Hofmann (1876–1957), inventor of windshield wipers, shock absorbers for vehicles, and oil burning furnace
 Leonid Hurwicz (1917–2008), economist, Nobel Prize winner (2007)
 Tomasz Imieliński (born 1954), computer scientist, most known in the areas of data mining, mobile computing, data extraction, and search engine technology 
 Christopher Jargocki (born 1944), physicist and author
 Paul G. Kaminski, behind stealth technology.
 Hilary Koprowski (1916–2013), virologist and immunologist
 Alfred Korzybski (1879–1950), developed the theory of general semantics
Richard Kowalski (born 1963), astronomer
Robert Kowalski (born 1941), logician, and computer scientist
 Stephanie Kwolek (1923–2014), inventor of kevlar
 Gerhard Lenski (1924–2015), sociologist known for contributions to the sociology of religion, social inequality, and ecological-evolutionary social theory
 Richard Lenski (born 1956), evolutionary biologist, proved evolution with the E. coli long-term evolution experiment
 Cass Lewart, electrical engineer and author
 Janusz Liberkowski (born 1953), winner of the first season of the show American Inventor; his invention was the Anecia Safety Capsule
 Stephen J. Lukasik, a director of USA tech at DARPA
 Henryk Magnuski (1909–1978), inventor of the first walkie talkie the SCR-300
 Bronislaw Malinowski (1884–1942), one of the most important 20th-century anthropologists
 Krzysztof Matyjaszewski (born 1950), polymer chemist best known for the discovery of atom transfer radical polymerization (ATRP)
 Albert Abraham Michelson (1852–1931), Polish-born American physicist; awarded the Nobel Prize in physics (1907) for work done on the measurement of the speed of light; the first American to receive the Nobel in the sciences
 Ralph Modjeski (1861–1940), engineer and bridge builder
 Jan Moor-Jankowski (1924–2005), primatologist; Polish independence fighter during World War II
 Tomasz Mrowka (born 1961), American mathematician specializing in differential geometry and gauge theory.
 Stanisław Mrozowski (1902–1999), worked on the Manhattan Project
 Jan Mycielski (born 1932), mathematician whose work includes the Ehrenfeucht–Mycielski sequence, The Mycielskian, The Mycielski–Grötzsch graph and Mycielski's theorem
 Bohdan Paczyński (1940–2007), astronomer, leading scientist in theory of the evolution of stars
 Scott E. Parazynski (born 1961), NASA astronaut, performed a dangerous EVA never performed before to repair a live solar array on the International Space Station
 Sabrina Gonzalez Pasterski (born 1993), physicist described as next Einstein by Harvard.
 James A. Pawelczyk (born 1960), astronaut, associate professor of Physiology and Kinesiology at Penn State; the first Pole in outer space (1980)
 Sidney Pestka (1936–2016), geneticist and biochemist who discovered how mRNA is translated into proteins through a small ribosomal subunit
 Frank Piasecki (1929–2008), aviation engineer, developed vertical lift aircraft
 Piotr Piecuch (born 1960), physical chemist, best known for his work in theoretical and computational chemistry, particularly ab initio quantum-mechanical methods based on coupled-cluster theory
 Marek Pienkowski (born 1945), medical researcher and clinician known for innovations in diagnosis and treatment of immunological deficiencies and asthma/allergic disorders.
Nikodem Poplawski, physicist described as next Einstein, who's theory is every black hole contains another universe.
 Isidor Isaac Rabi (1898–1988), emigrated to the U.S. in 1899; awarded the Nobel Prize in Physics (1944) for work on molecular-beam magnetic-resonance detection method.
 Wojciech Rostafiński (1921–2002), worked for NASA; contributed to the theory of aeronautics and applied mathematics; listed in Scientific Citation Index
 Albert Sabin, Polish-born medical scientist, discovered oral vaccine for poliomyelitis; President of the Weizmann Institute of Science
 Andrew Schally (born 1926), endocrinologist and Nobel Prize winner in 1977 in Medicine for research work
 Terry Sejnowski (born 1947), neuroscientists whose research in neural networks and computational neuroscience has been pioneering.
 Tadeusz Sendzimir (1894–1989), engineer and inventor of international renown with 120 patents in mining and metallurgy, 73 of which were awarded to him in the United States
 Maria Siemionow, Polish surgeon who performed the first face transplant surgery in the U.S.
 Igor Sikorsky (1889–1972), helicopter engineer who founded the first helicopter industry in the U.S.
 Iwona Stroynowski (born 1950), immunologist she discovered the process of gene expression control called attenuation, the first example of a riboswitch mechanism
 Ryszard Syski (1924–2017), mathematician whose research was in queueing theory
 Stanisław Szarek (born 1953), mathematician his research concerns convex geometry and functional analysis
 Jack W. Szostak (born 1952), Nobel Prize–winning biologist; his work helped us to understand telomeres and helped create the human genome project
 Bolesław Szymański (born 1950), computer scientist, he's known for multiple contributions into computer science, including Szymański's algorithm
 Alfred Tarski (1902–1983), mathematician and philosopher
 Joseph Tykociński-Tykociner (1877–1969), patent and invention of sound film on motion pictures
 Adam Ulam (1922–2000), historian and political scientist at Harvard University, one of the world's foremost authorities on Russia and the Soviet Union
 Stanisław Ulam (1909–1984), mathematician who participated in the Manhattan Project and proposed the Teller–Ulam design of thermonuclear weapons
 Thaddeus Vincenty (1920–2002), geodesist, he devised Vincenty's formulae, a geodesic calculation technique published in 1975 which is accurate to about half a millimeter
 Andrzej Walicki (1930–2020), economist; in 1998 he won Balzan Prize for his contribution to the study of the Russian and Polish cultural and social history, and also the study of European culture in the 19th century
 Frank Wilczek (born 1951), physicist, Nobel Prize 2004
 Anne Wojcicki, biotech analyst, biologist, and businesswoman; co-founder of 23andMe (genetics testing)
 Stanley Wojcicki, professor and former chair of the physics department at Stanford University in California
 Aleksander Wolszczan (born 1946), astronomer, discoverer of the first extrasolar planets and pulsar planets
 Robert Zajonc (1923–2008), social psychologist
 Maria Zakrzewska (1829–1902), pioneering female doctor in the United States
 Edmund Zalinski (1849–1909), invented pneumatic dynamite torpedo-gun, invented an electrical fuse, Other inventions included a modified entrenching tool, a ramrod-bayonet, and a telescopic sight for artillery and the Zalinsky boat, one of the earliest submarines in the United States
 George D. Zamka (born 1962), NASA astronaut
 Casimir Zeglen (1869–19??), invented the bulletproof vest in 1897; a Catholic priest of St. Stanislaus Kostka Roman Catholic Church in Chicago
 Florian Znaniecki (1882–1958), sociologist and philosopher
 Wojciech H. Zurek (1900–1992), pioneer in information physics; co-author of a proof stating that a single quantum cannot be cloned; coined the terms "einselection" and "quantum discord"
 Antoni Zygmund (1900–1992), mathematician, "trigonometric series"

Sports

Baseball

 Rick Ankiel (born 1979), former professional baseball outfielder and pitcher
 Mike Bielecki (born 1959), former professional baseball player
 Dave Borkowski (born 1977), former Major League Baseball relief pitcher
 Joe Borowski, Cleveland Indians closing pitcher
 Stan Coveleski (1889–1984), Major League Baseball player during the 1910s and 1920s
 Jim Czajkowski (born 1963), Major League Baseball starting pitcher
 Doug Drabek (born 1962), former professional baseball player
 Kyle Drabek (born 1987), former professional baseball player
 Moe Drabowsky (1935–2006), right-handed relief pitcher in Major League Baseball
 Dave Dombrowski (born 1956), baseball executive
 Tim Federowicz (born 1987), catcher for the Chicago Cubs
 Mark Fidrych (1954–2009), pitcher in Major League Baseball
 Jason Grabowski (born 1976), pitcher in Major League Baseball
 Johnny Grabowski (1900–1946), catcher in Major League Baseball
 Steve Gromek (1920–2002), pitcher in Major League BaseballBaseball
 Mark Grudzielanek (born 1970), second baseman in Major League Baseball, plays for the Kansas City Royals
 Kevin Gryboski (born 1973), right-handed pitcher in Major League Baseball
 Mark Gubicza (born 1962), former pitcher in Major League Baseball
 Ray Jablonski (1926–1985), third baseman in Major League Baseball with an eight-year career from 1953 to 1960
 Scott Kamieniecki (born 1964), former professional baseball player
 Matt Kata (born 1978), Major League Baseball infielder
 Ryan Klesko (born 1971), Major League Baseball player
 Ted Kluszewski (1924–1988), Major League first baseman
 Paul Konerko (born 1976), former professional baseball first baseman
 Tony Kubek (born 1936), baseball player and television broadcaster
 Whitey Kurowski (1918–1999), third baseman in Major League Baseball who played his entire career for the St. Louis Cardinals (1941–49)
 Mat Latos (born 1987), professional baseball pitcher
 Eddie Lopat (1918–1992), Major League Baseball pitcher
 Stan Lopata (1925–2013), Major League Baseball player
 Mark Lukasiewicz (born 1973), former professional baseball player who played two seasons for the Anaheim Angels
 Greg Luzinski (born 1950), former left fielder in Major League Baseball
 Joe Maddon (born 1954), Major League Baseball manager, currently serving as manager of the Chicago Cubs
 Gary Majewski (born 1980), former Major League Baseball pitcher
 Phil Mankowski (born 1953), former third baseman in Major League Baseball who played for the Detroit Tigers and New York Mets
 Brian Matusz (born 1987), professional baseball pitcher for the Baltimore Orioles of Major League Baseball
 Bill Mazeroski (born 1936), former Major League baseball player
 Barney McCosky (1917–1996), center fielder/left fielder in Major League Baseball
 Doug Mientkiewicz (born 1974), former first baseman for the Minnesota Twins, Boston Red Sox, and several other MLB teams
 Dave Mlicki (born 1968), former right-handed pitcher in Major League Baseball
 Stan Musial (1920–2013), Major League Baseball player who played 22 seasons for the St. Louis Cardinals from 1941 to 1963
 Joe Niekro (1944–2006), starting pitcher in Major League Baseball; younger brother of Hall of Fame pitcher Phil Niekro; father of first baseman Lance Niekro
 Phil Niekro (1939–2020), former pitcher in Major League Baseball and member of the Baseball Hall of Fame
 C. J. Nitkowski (born 1973), left-handed former professional baseball pitcher
 Tom Paciorek (born 1946), Major League outfielder and first baseman for 18 seasons between 1970 and 1987
 Freddie Patek (born 1944), Major League Baseball player for the Pittsburgh Pirates, Kansas City Royals, and California Angels
 Ron Perranoski (1936–2020), Major League pitcher
 A. J. Pierzynski (born 1976), Major League catcher
 Stephen Piscotty (born 1991) Major League Outfielder for Oakland Athletics and St. Louis Cardinals 
 Johnny Podres (1932–2008), Major League Baseball left-handed starting pitcher
 Jack Quinn (1883–1946), Major League pitcher
 Ron Reed (born 1942), Major League pitcher
 Marc Rzepczynski (born 1985), Major League pitcher
 Art Shamsky (born 1941), outfielder in Major League Baseball and Israel Baseball League manager
 Ryan Sherriff (born 1990), pitcher for the St. Louis Cardinals
 Al Simmons (1902–1956), player in Major League Baseball over three decades
 Bill "Moose" Skowron (1930–2012), Major League Baseball player, primarily a first baseman
 Matt Szczur (born 1989), active Major League outfielder for the Chicago Cubs
 Frank Tanana (born 1953), former left-handed pitcher in Major League Baseball
 Alan Trammell (born 1958), baseball shortstop for the Detroit Tigers from 1977 to 1996
 Troy Tulowitzki (born 1984), Major League Baseball shortstop
 Helen Walulik (1929–2012), All-American Girls Professional Baseball League player
 Ted Wilks (1915–1989), relief pitcher (aka "The Cork") with the St. Louis Cardinals, Pittsburgh Pirates, Cleveland Indians; coach of the Kansas City A's (now Oakland)
 Carl Yastrzemski (born 1939), Major League Baseball player
 Richie Zisk (born 1949), Major League Baseball player for the Pittsburgh Pirates, Chicago White Sox, Texas Rangers, and Seattle Mariners from 1971 to 1983

Basketball

 Carol Blazejowski (born 1956), women's professional basketball player
 Vince Boryla (1927–2016), former NBA player for the New York Knicks, first ever NBA All-Star player of Polish descent, coach, and Denver Nuggets executive
 Frank Brickowski (born 1959), 12-year NBA veteran
 Olek Czyż (born 1990), Duke Blue Devils and Nevada Wolf Pack NCAA player
 Dan Dickau (born 1978), former professional basketball and NBA player
 Phil Farbman (1924–1996), basketball player
 Kyle Filipowski (born 2003), committed to Duke, he is a consensus five-star recruit and one of the top players in the 2022 class 
 Mike Gminski (born 1959), former college and professional basketball player, 14-year NBA veteran
 Tom Gola (1933–2014), one of Philadelphia's most famous basketball players 5-time NBA All-Star and NBA Champion
 Joe Graboski (1930–1998), 13-year NBA veteran
 Bobby Hurley (born 1971), former Duke and NBA basketball player
 Frank Kaminsky (born 1993), current NBA player
 Joe Kopicki (born 1960), former NBA player
 Thomas Kelati (born 1982), professional basketball player for the Polish national team
 Len Kosmalski (born 1951), former NBA player
 Ronald Kozlicki (born 1944), former ABA basketball player
 Larry Krystkowiak (born 1964), 10-year NBA veteran
 Mike Krzyzewski (born 1947), head coach of the Duke University men's basketball team and the 2008 gold medal-winning U.S. men's Olympic basketball team
 Steve Kuberski (born 1947), former NBA player and NBA Champion, last ever Boston Celtic to wear no 33 jersey before the arrival of Larry Bird
 Bruce Kuczenski (born 1961), former basketball and NBA player
 Leo Kubiak (born 1926/1927), former BAA and minor league baseball player
 Mitch Kupchak (born 1954), former 9-year NBA veteran, NBA Champion and former general manager of the Los Angeles Lakers
 Bob Kurland (1924–2013), 7-foot basketball center
 Christian Laettner (born 1969), 13-year NBA veteran, NBA All-Star and a member of the 1992 Olympics men's team
 John Laskowski (born 1953), former Chicago Bulls player, nicknamed 'Super Sub'
 Hank Lefkowitz (1923–2007), former BAA player
 Red Mihalik (1916–1996), NCAA and Olympic official/referee
 Paul Mokeski (born 1957), 12-year NBA veteran
 Mike Peplowski (born 1970), former NBA player
 Eric Piatkowski (born 1970), former 14-year NBA veteran with the Los Angeles Clippers, Houston Rockets, Chicago Bulls and Phoenix Suns
 Walt Piatkowski (born 1945), former ABA player, Eric Piatkowski's father
 Stan Pietkiewicz (born 1956), former NBA player
 Dave Piontek (1934–2004), former 7-year NBA player
 Tom Piotrowski (born 1960), former NBA player
 Joe Proski (born 1939), first trainer of Phoenix Suns; inducted into Phoenix Ring of Fame in 2001
 Joel Przybilla (born 1979), former 13-year NBA veteran
 Ray Radziszewski (born 1935), former professional basketball player
 George Ratkovicz (1922–2008), former 6-year NBA player
 Jim Rowinski (born 1961), former NBA player
 Ed Sadowski (1917–1990), former BAA and NBA player
 Jeremy Sochan (born 2003), Polish-American professional basketball player for the San Antonio Spurs of the NBA. He is also a member of Poland men's national basketball team.
 Ed Stanczak (1921–2004), former NBA player
 Bob Sura (born 1973), former NBA player for the Cavaliers, Warriors, Pistons, Hawks and Rockets.
 Wally Szczerbiak (born 1977), former 10-year NBA veteran, NBA All-Star. Although his father claimed the family is of Ukrainian descent, Szczerbiak is a 100% Polish surname. Considering that most of the western part of today's Ukrainian territory was for centuries a part of the Polish empire, Polish roots of Szczerbiak's family are obvious.
 Walter Szczerbiak (born 1949), Wally Szczerbiak's father, former ABA player
 A.J. Slaughter (born 1987), professional basketball player for the Polish national team
 Kelly Tripucka (born 1959), former 10-year NBA veteran for the Detroit Pistons, Utah Jazz, and Charlotte Hornets, two-time NBA All-Star
 Dave Twardzik (born 1950), former NBA and ABA player, ABA All-Star and 1977 NBA Champion
 Jayson Williams (born 1968), former NBA player for the 76ers and New Jersey Nets, NBA All-Star in 1998. He is of Polish, Italian and African-American descent
 Steve Wojciechowski (born 1976), former head coach of the Marquette University men's basketball team
 Dennis Wuycik (born 1950), former ABA player

Bowling
 Eddie Lubanski, considered one of the greatest bowlers of all time; in the Guinness book of World Records

Boxing
 Bobby Czyz (born 1962), boxer
 Andrew Golota (born 1968), professional boxer from Poland who has been involved in many controversial fights
 Stanley Ketchel (1886–1910), boxer who became one of the greatest world middleweight champions
Adam Kownacki (born 1989), heavyweight boxer born in Poland, and lived in the United States since 1996
 Stanley Poreda (1909–1983), Jersey City boxer considered a top heavyweight contender in the early 1930s
 Paweł Wolak (born 1981), former WBC USNBC Light Middleweight Champion
 Teddy Yarosz (1910–1974), NBA Middleweight Boxing Champion
 Tony Zale (1913–1997), two-time Middleweight World Champion Boxer

Fencing
 Monica Aksamit (born 1990), Olympic bronze medalist, Women's Team Saber
 Dagmara Wozniak (born 1988), Olympic bronze medalist, Women's Team Saber

Figure skating
 Colette Kaminski (born 1997), figure skater
 Tara Lipinski (born 1982), Olympic gold medalist figure skater and celebrity
 Janet Lynn (born 1953), figure skater and Olympic bronze medalist

Football

 Danny Abramowicz (born 1945), wide receiver in the NFL who played for the New Orleans Saints and the San Francisco 49ers
 Pete Banaszak (born 1944), college and professional football player
 Steve Bartkowski (born 1952), former NFL quarterback
 Tom Brady (born 1977), 6 time Super Bowl champion, NFL quarterback for the New England Patriots; Maternal grandmother of Polish descent.
 Zeke Bratkowski (1931–2019), All-American quarterback at the University of Georgia in 1952 and 1953
 Bryan Bulaga (born 1989), NFL offensive tackle
 Carter Bykowski (born 1990), football player
 Frank Bykowski (1915–1985), football player
 Brad Cieslak (born 1982), tight end in the NFL; currently plays for the Cleveland Browns
 Lou Creekmur (1927–2009), NFL left offensive tackle/guard for the Detroit Lions from 1951 to 1959
 Frank Dancewicz (1924–1985), former NFL quarterback
 Mike Ditka (born 1939), former NFL player, television commentator, and coach
 Julian Edelman (born 1986), New England Patriots player
 Frank Gatski (1919–2005), former NFL player
 Mike Gesicki (born 1995), football player
 Tom Glassic (born 1954), former NFL player, guard for the Denver Broncos of the NFL from 1976 to 1983
 Mark Glowinski (born 1992), football player
 Stephen Gostkowski (born 1984), placekicker for the New England Patriots of the NFL
 Jim Grabowski (born 1944), football player and broadcaster
 Bruce Gradkowski, quarterback for the Cincinnati Bengals
 Chris Gronkowski (born 1986), fullback for the Denver Broncos
 Dan Gronkowski (born 1985), tight end for the Cleveland Browns
 Rob Gronkowski (born 1989), former tight end for the New England Patriots
 Jack Ham (born 1948), former linebacker who played for the Pittsburgh Steelers
 Jim Harbaugh (born 1963), NFL quarterback and coach
 John Harbaugh (born 1962), NFL coach
 Leon Hart (1928–2002), tight end and defensive end
 Henry Hynoski (born 1988), fullback for the New York Giants
 Jim Irsay (born 1959), owner and CEO of the Indianapolis Colts
 Jeff Jagodzinski (born 1963), head coach of the Boston College Eagles football team
 Sebastian Janikowski (born 1978 in Poland), former kicker for the Oakland Raiders/Seattle Seahawks
 Vic Janowicz (1930–1996), halfback for Ohio State University
 Ron Jaworski (born 1951), former football player, NFL analyst on ESPN
 Kyle Juszczyk (born 1991), NFL player
 Mike Kenn (born 1956), former offensive tackle for the Atlanta Falcons
 Joe Klecko (born 1953), former NFL defensive end
 Gary Kubiak (born 1961), NFL coach and former player
 Frank Kush (1929–2017), football coach who most prominently served as head coach at Arizona State University for more than two decades
 Joe Kowalewski (born 1982), tight end for the New York Jets
 Brian Kozlowski (born 1970), former NFL tight end
 Glen Kozlowski (born 1962), wide receiver for the Chicago Bears
 Joe Kulbacki (1938–2012), Buffalo Bills
 Ted Kwalick (born 1947), former tight end in the NFL and World Football League
 Nick Kwiatkoski (born 1993), NFL linebacker
 Chris Liwienski (born 1975), former offensive guard
 Johnny Lujack (born 1925), former quarterback for the University of Notre Dame and the Chicago Bears
 Don Majkowski (born 1964), former NFL quarterback
 Stas Maliszewski (born 1944), Princeton All-American 1964 and 1965, Baltimore Colts 1966 NFL Draft
 Ted Marchibroda (1931–2016), former quarterback and head coach in the NFL
 Dan Marino, former quarterback for the Miami Dolphins
 John Matuszak (1950–1989), former defensive end with the Oilers, Chiefs, and Raiders; son of Marv Matuszak
 Marv Matuszak (1931–2004), former linebacker; son of John Matuszak
 Lou Michaels, former pro defensive lineman, 1958–1971, with the Colts, Steelers, Rams, and Packers
 Walt Michaels (1929–2019), former player and coach, remembered for his six-year tenure as head coach of the New York Jets from 1977 to 1982
 Dick Modzelewski (1931–2018), former college and pro football player with the Redskins, Steelers, Giants and Browns; coach for the Cleveland Browns; member of the College Football Hall of Fame
 Gene Mruczkowski (born 1980), offensive lineman for the New England Patriots of the NFL
 Scott Mruczkowski (born 1982), center, San Diego Chargers, Bowling Green
 Mike Munchak (born 1960), former pro offense with the Houston Oilers; Pro Football Hall of Fame
 Bronko Nagurski (1908–1990), former NFL player and professional wrestler
 Ray Nitschke (1936–1998), former Hall of Fame NFL linebacker for the Green Bay Packers
 Bill Osmanski (1915–1996), College and Pro Football Hall of Fame; former player with Chicago Bears
 Walt Patulski (born 1950), former defensive end for the University of Notre Dame, Buffalo Bills, and St. Louis Cardinals
 Jason Pociask (born 1983), tight end for the New York Jets
 Paul Posluszny (born 1984), linebacker for the Jacksonville Jaguars
 Bill Romanowski (born 1966), former football player for the San Francisco 49ers and Oakland Raiders
 Tony Romo, NFL quarterback for the Dallas Cowboys
 Ed Rutkowski (born 1941), former wide receiver and quarterback for the Buffalo Bills; later became County Executive of Erie County (Buffalo)
 Jack Sack (1902–1980), American football player and coach
 John Sandusky (1925–2006), former NFL player for the Browns and Packers, former head coach of the Colts, of Irish and Polish descent.
 Mark Stepnoski, one of NFL's top linemen with the Dallas Cowboys
 Hank Stram (1923–2005), Head Coach, Kansas City Chiefs
 Mike Tomczak (born 1962), former NFL quarterback
 Frank Tripucka (1927–2013), former quarterback for the Broncos, Cardinals and Lions
 Steve Wisniewski, former pro-bowler, offensive guard with the Oakland Raiders
 Alex Wojciechowicz (1915–1992), former offensive lineman and linebacker for the Detroit Lions and Philadelphia Eagles
 Tom Zbikowski (born 1985), safety for the Baltimore Ravens

Golf 
 Billy Burke (1902–1972), prominent golfer of the 1930s
 Jim Furyk (born May 12, 1970), professional golfer, 2003 U.S. Open winner, FedEx Cup Champion, PGA Tour Player of the Year, Ryder Cup captain
 Betsy King (born 1955), professional golfer
 Paul Stankowski (born 1969), professional golfer with two PGA Tour wins; finished tied for 5th at the 1997 Masters as well as a tie for 17th at the 1997 U.S. Open
 Bob Toski (born 1926), golf player and teacher
 Al Watrous (1899–1983), PGA champion
 Walt Zembriski (born May 4, 1935), former ironworker; played on both the PGA and Senior PGA tour

Hockey
 Justin Abdelkader (born 1987), left wing for the Detroit Red Wings from Muskegon, Michigan
 Matt Bartkowski (born 1988), defenseman for the Minnesota Wild from Pittsburgh, Pennsylvania
 Eric Boguniecki (born 1975), center for the Anaheim Ducks from New Haven, Connecticut
 Jonny Brodzinski (born 1993), forward for the Los Angeles Kings from Blaine, Minnesota
 Len Ceglarski (1926–2017), U.S. Olympic ice hockey team silver medal winner, 1952
 Austin Czarnik (born 1992), center for the Calgary Flames from Washington, Michigan
 Alex Goligoski (born 1985), defenseman for the Arizona Coyotes from Grand Rapids, Minnesota
 Patrick Kaleta (born 1986), retired NHL forward from Angola, New York
 Mike Komisarek (born 1982), defenseman for the Toronto Maple Leafs from West Islip, New York
 Ed Olczyk (born 1966), former head coach and player in the National Hockey League
 Joe Pavelski (born 1984), center for the Dallas Stars from Stevens Point, Wisconsin
 Lee Stempniak (born 1983), NHL free agent
 Andy Welinski (born 1993), defenseman for the Philadelphia Flyers from Duluth, Minnesota
 Zach Werenski (born 1997), defenseman for the Columbus Blue Jackets from Grosse Pointe, Michigan
 James Wisniewski (born 1984), defenseman for the Columbus Blue Jackets from Canton, Michigan
 Luke Witkowski (born 1990), defenseman for the Tampa Bay Lightning from Holland, Michigan
 Andy Wozniewski (born 1980), retired NHL defenseman

Media
 Adrian Wojnarowski (born 1968/69), Yahoo! Sports NBA reporter (The Vertical), originator of the "Woj Bomb"

Olympic athletes

 Monica Aksamit (born 1990), Olympic bronze medalist, Women's Team Saber
 Lillian Copeland (1904–1964) - Olympic discus champion; set world records in discus, javelin, and shot put
 Alyson Dudek (born 1990), short track speed skater at the 2010 and 2014 Winter Olympics; won bronze in 2010
 Mark Gorski (born 1960), track cyclist; gold medal
 Bob Gutowski (1935–1960), pole vaulter; won silver at 1956 Summer Olympics
 Jeffrey Klepacki, rower in 1992, 1996 and 2000 Olympics; won Rowing World Championship titles in 1994, 1998 and 1999
 Christopher Liwski, rower in 2004 and 2008 Olympic teams (alternate); won Rowing World Championship title in 2007
 Norbert Schemansky (1924–2016), gold, silver and bronze Olympic m in weightlifting
 Jenn Suhr (née Stuczynski), pole vaulter, won silver at 2008 Summer Olympics
 Stanisława Walasiewicz (a.k.a. Stella Walsh) (1911–1980), athlete and Olympic champion
 Dagmara Wozniak (born 1988), Olympic bronze medalist, Women's Team Saber
 Sam Mikulak (born 1992), retired three time Olympian, Artistic Gymnastics

Soccer
 Brad Guzan, USA international goalkeeper currently playing for Atlanta United
 Wojtek Krakowiak (born 1976), soccer player; most recently for the Tampa Bay Mutiny of Major League Soccer
 Matt Miazga (born 1995), soccer player for Chelsea F.C. and for the United States men's national soccer team; currently loaned to SBV Vitesse.
 Gabriel Slonina (born 2004), soccer player for Chicago Fire FC
 Danny Szetela (born 1987), soccer player for the Columbus Crew of the MLS
 Chris Wondolowski (born 1983), soccer player for the San Jose Earthquakes of the MLS; 2010 MLS Golden Boot winner

Wrestling

 Ole Anderson (born 1942)
 Killer Kowalski (1926–2008)
 Chris Mordetsky (born 1983)
 Beth Phoenix (born 1980)
 Ivan Putski (born 1941), Polish-born American professional wrestler and champion
 Stanley Radwan (1908–1998), professional wrestler and strongman
 Trish Stratus (born 1975)
 Greg "The Hammer" Valentine (born 1950)
 Johnny Valentine (1928–2001)
 Rob Van Dam (born 1970)
 Velvet Sky (born 1981)
 Stanislaus Zbyszko (1879–1967)

Other sports

 Tony Adamowicz (1941–2016), champion SCCA and IMSA road racing driver
 Jane Bartkowicz (born 1949), a top woman U.S. tennis player in the 1960s
 Frank Cumiskey (1912–2004), Olympic gymnast
 Kevin Cywinski (born 1965), NASCAR driver
 Arthur Dake (1910–2000), Grand Master chess player
 Stefan Janoski (born 1979), professional skateboarder of half-Polish, half-Irish descent; one of the most recognized pro skateboarders
 Henryk Jordan (1842–1907), philanthropist, physician, and pioneer of physical education in Poland
 Brad Keselowski (born 1984), NASCAR driver
 Brian Keselowski (born 1981), NASCAR driver
 Ed Korfanty, fencing master, U.S. National Women's saber coach, Olympic saber coach, and a former Men's Veteran's Saber World Champion
 Steve Kuclo (born 1985), bodybuilder
 Alan Kulwicki (1954–1993), auto racing champion
 Dylan Kwasniewski (born 1995), NASCAR driver
 Thai-Son Kwiatkowski (born 1995), tennis player
 Billy Packer (born 1940), sportscaster for CBS Sports
 Gary Styczynski (born 1965), professional poker player; won the 2007 World Series of Poker

Other
 George Adamski (1891–1965), one of the first people to publicly claim to have seen and photographed UFOs
 Francis E. Dec (1926–1996), outsider writer and predecessor to targeted individuals
 Leon Czolgosz (1873–1901), assassin of U.S. President William McKinley
 John Wayne Gacy (1942–1994), serial killer, of Polish and Danish ancestry. His paternal grandparents (family name spelled "Gatza" or "Gaca") were from what is now Poland, then part of the German Empire.
 Ted Kaczynski (born 1942), the Unabomber
 Richard "Iceman" Kuklinski (1935–2006), notorious hitman, claimed to have killed 200 people
 Meyer Lansky (1902-1983), an organized crime figure who was instrumental in the development of the National Crime Syndicate in the United States
 Jan Lewan (born 1941), songwriter and polka band leader (known as the "Polka King"), who ran a Ponzi scheme
 Curtis Sliwa (born 1954), Guardian Angels founder
 Wilfrid Michael Voynich (1865–1930), antiquarian and bibliophile, and the eponym of the Voynich manuscript
 Henry Earl J. Wojciechowski (aka Hymie Weiss) (1898–1926), mob boss and rival of Al Capone
 John Wojnowski (born 1943), protester against pedophilia in the Catholic Church.

References

Polish American
Americans
Polish